Newark is a constituency in Nottinghamshire, England.  It is currently represented by Robert Jenrick of the Conservative Party who won the seat in a by-election on 5 June 2014, following the resignation of Patrick Mercer in April 2014.

Boundaries 

1918–1950: The Municipal Borough of Newark, and the Rural Districts of Bingham, Newark, and Southwell.

1950–1983: The Municipal Borough of Newark, the Urban District of Mansfield Woodhouse, and the Rural Districts of Newark and Southwell.

1983–2010: The District of Newark wards of Beacon, Bridge, Bullpit Pinfold, Castle, Caunton, Collingham, Devon, Elston, Farndon, Magnus, Meering, Milton Lowfield, Muskham, Southwell East, Southwell West, Sutton on Trent, Trent, and Winthorpe, and the District of Bassetlaw wards of East Markham, East Retford East, East Retford North, East Retford West, Elkesley, Trent, and Tuxford.

2010–present: The District of Newark and Sherwood wards of Balderton North, Balderton West, Beacon, Bridge, Castle, Caunton, Collingham and Meering, Devon, Farndon, Lowdham, Magnus, Muskham, Southwell East, Southwell North, Southwell West, Sutton-on-Trent, Trent, and Winthorpe, the District of Bassetlaw wards of East Markham, Rampton, Tuxford, and Trent, and the Borough of Rushcliffe wards of Bingham East, Bingham West, Cranmer, Oak, and Thoroton.

The constituency covers large parts of the Newark and Sherwood district which encompasses the east of Nottinghamshire, as such includes the towns of Newark-on-Trent and Southwell, and the villages of Collingham and Sutton-on-Trent.  It also covers parts of the Bassetlaw and Rushcliffe areas including Markham Moor and Bingham.

History 
A parliamentary borough of the same name existed from 1673 to 1885, when it was replaced by a county division of the same name, the year of the Redistribution of Seats Act 1885.

Newark was the last borough to be added to the Unreformed House of Commons which took place in 1673, prior to the Reform Act 1832.  It returned two representatives to Parliament from 1673 until 1885.  The future Prime Minister, William Ewart Gladstone, began his political career as Member of Parliament for Newark from 1832 to 1845.

More recently, the Labour Party held Newark (on substantially different boundaries to the present ones) from 1950 until 1979, when it was taken by the Conservatives' Richard Alexander.  Alexander lost his seat during Labour's landslide victory at the 1997 general election.  The victorious Labour candidate, Fiona Jones, was convicted of electoral fraud and expelled from the House of Commons in 1999 over misrepresented election expenses.  The conviction was later overturned upon appeal and she returned to Parliament.  However, Jones lost her seat at the 2001 general election to Patrick Mercer of the Conservatives, who held it until 2014.

Mercer held the position of Shadow Minister for Homeland Security from June 2003 until March 2007, when he was forced to resign following racially contentious comments made to The Times.

The Newark constituency in 2010 lost the town of Retford to the Bassetlaw constituency (although Newark still has a smaller part of the Bassetlaw district), but gained land in and around Bingham from the Rushcliffe constituency, thus making it much safer Conservative territory.

Following an investigation by Commons authorities finding that Mr Mercer had engaged in paid lobbying, not properly reported the income or declared his interest, and repeatedly seriously denigrated other members, Patrick Mercer stepped down as MP for Newark on 30 April 2014.

Robert Jenrick was elected in the subsequent by-election, in the Conservative Party's largest by-election majority for four decades. He was appointed on 24 July 2019 as Secretary of State for Housing, Communities and Local Government under Prime Minister Boris Johnson.

Constituency profile
Many towns are historic in architecture with many well-preserved listed buildings whereas much of the council housing in the constituency has been privately acquired and improved under the right to buy. Nonetheless, there is a significant minority of social housing but this dependency and the proportion of flats is lower than the national average across the three districts.

Labour held the seat for one term following their 1997 landslide victory, but subsequent major boundary changes have brought in more rural areas and made the seat into one of the most strongly Conservative voting in the UK.

Members of Parliament

MPs before 1885

MPs since 1885

Elections

Elections in the 2010s

Elections in the 2000s

Elections in the 1990s

Elections in the 1980s

Elections in the 1970s

Elections in the 1960s

Elections in the 1950s

Elections in the 1940s

Elections in the 1930s

Elections in the 1920s

Elections in the 1910s 

General Election 1914–15:

Another General Election was required to take place before the end of 1915. The political parties had been making preparations for an election to take place and by July 1914, the following candidates had been selected; 
Unionist: Arthur Colefax
Liberal: Robert Burley Wallis

Elections in the 1900s

Elections in the 1890s 

 Caused by Finch-Hatton's resignation.

Elections in the 1880s

Elections in the 1870s

 

 

 

 

 Caused by Denison's death.

Elections in the 1860s

Elections in the 1850s

Elections in the 1840s

 
  
 

 

 Caused by Gladstone's appointment as Secretary of State for War and the Colonies

 Caused by Gladstone's appointment as Vice-President of the Board of Trade and Master of the Mint

 
  
 

 

 
  

 

 Caused by Wilde's appointment as Solicitor General for England and Wales

Elections in the 1830s

 
 
 

 
 
 

 
 
 

 

 
 
 

 

 
 
 

 

 Caused by Willoughby's resignation

See also 
 List of parliamentary constituencies in Nottinghamshire

Notes

References

Parliamentary constituencies in Nottinghamshire
Constituencies of the Parliament of the United Kingdom established in 1673
Newark and Sherwood
Bassetlaw District
Newark-on-Trent